The American Labor Party (ALP) was a political party in the United States established in 1936 that was active almost exclusively in the state of New York. The organization was founded by labor leaders and former members of the Socialist Party of America who had established themselves as the Social Democratic Federation (SDF). The party was intended to parallel the role of the British Labour Party, serving as an umbrella organization to unite New York social democrats of the SDF with trade unionists who would otherwise support candidates of the Republican and Democratic parties.

History

Establishing the ALP 

In 1934, the factional war that dominated the life of the Socialist Party of America had reached a turning point. After beating back a challenge to their position and authority in 1932, the New York-based "Old Guard" of the party had been resoundingly defeated at the 1934 National Convention of the Socialist Party. A coalition of radical pacifists surrounding the charismatic former preacher Norman Thomas and a growing body of young Marxists, known as the Militant faction, had won control of the organization's governing National Executive Committee. They passed a provocative Declaration of Principles, which the Old Guard regarded as a direct call to insurrection. Further galling from the perspective of the Old Guard, was the eagerness of Thomas and the Militants to build what they called an "all-inclusive party," bringing radical intellectuals into party ranks from various oppositional communist orbits and working with the Communist Party USA in united front actions.

The New York Old Guard returned home to organize the Committee for the Preservation of the Socialist Party, raising funds, selecting a "Provisional Executive Committee," building a mailing list, and maintaining an office in New York City. Headed by former New York State Assemblyman Louis Waldman, the Old Guard also took steps to lock up the ownership and funds of various party-affiliated institutions, including The Jewish Daily Forward, the English weekly The New Leader, and the Rand School of Social Science.

In 1944, August Claessens joined with Socialist Party leaders Harry Laidler and Paul Blanshard in attempting to defeat the Communist-dominated faction that had gained control of the ALP.  Failing to win control of that organization, Claessens and his associates withdrew that same year and established the Liberal Party of New York as a rival organization. Claessens would be a Liberal Party candidate for the State Assembly several times, failing to win election.

In his 1944 memoir, Waldman wrote:     <blockquote>Back from Detroit, I was immediately confronted with a problem which involved millions of dollars of property controlled by subsidiaries of the Socialist Party. In New York alone there were such institutions as the Jewish Daily Forward, the leading Jewish newspaper in the world with a circulation running into hundreds of thousands and with reserve funds amounting to millions. There was The New Leader, a weekly newspaper published in English; there was the Rand School of Social Science, which, together with Camp Tamiment, had enormous property value, not to speak of their importance as propaganda and educational instruments. Control of the Forward alone also meant probable control of fraternal and labor organizations such as the Workmen's Circle, with its millions of dollars in property and tens of thousands of members throughout the United States....  After Detroit it was obvious that the militant Socialists controlled the Socialist Party. I saw that all they had to do in order to gain control of the valuable property in New York was to revoke the New York State charter and expel all state organizations controlled by the Social Democrats or the Old Guard. Since there was always a minority of militant Socialists in each of these corporate institutions, these properties involving millions of dollars in property value and cash reserves would quickly fall into the hands of the militants....  All during 1935 and the early part of 1936 my office was converted into a meeting place for the various committees and members of the organizations threatened by the militants. Constitutions and bylaws were modified in such a way as to prevent control falling into the hands of Norman Thomas' super-revolutionists. -- Louis Waldman, Labor Lawyer. New York: E.P. Dutton & Co., 1944; pp. 272-273.</ref></blockquote>     A year and a half of bitter factional warfare ensued. Finally, in January 1936, the governing National Executive Committee of the Socialist Party revoked the charter of its dissident New York state organization. The New York Old Guard and their cothinkers exited the Socialist Party and reorganized as the Social Democratic Federation of America (SDF).

The SDF sought to build close relations with the existing trade union movement and disliked, distrusted, and disavowed many of their former Socialist Party comrades and their pretensions to electoral office. In the New York municipal elections of 1935, the Socialists had polled nearly 200,000 votes, a showing that threatened to be a "spoiler" for the chances of Franklin D. Roosevelt in the forthcoming 1936 presidential elections. This view was shared with the Social Democrats by many in the New York trade union movement, who sought to bolster Roosevelt's chances in some way.

On April 1, 1936, Sidney Hillman, John L. Lewis, and other officials of the unions of the American Federation of Labor and the Congress of Industrial Organizations established Labor's Non-Partisan League (LNPL), an organization akin to the modern political action committee, designed to channel money and manpower to the campaigns of Roosevelt and others standing strongly for the declared interests of organized labor.

During the summer of 1936, the New York state organization of LNPL was transformed into an independent political party in an effort to bolster Roosevelt's electoral chances in the state by gaining him a place on a second candidate ballot line. The opportunity to pull the lever for the new American Labor Party, it was hoped, would siphon away a good percentage of the nearly 200,000 votes cast in 1932 for Norman Thomas and the Socialists.

The ALP in the elections from 1936 to 1948 

The ALP's most common strategy was to co-endorse the candidate of one or the other of the two major parties, based upon the perceived favorability of each to the cause of labor. It also nominated its own candidates for some positions, offering competition when neither of the two old party candidates passed muster. Although the organization was founded primarily as a vehicle to help assure Roosevelt's victory in New York in the 1936 campaign, in that election the victorious Democratic gubernatorial candidate, Herbert H. Lehman, had polled over 250,000 votes on the ALP line. Under New York state law, this meant that the ALP was henceforth qualified to register voters and conduct primary elections, thus insuring the organization's continued existence as a political party in the state.

The organization was largely funded by the needle trades unions of the state. The ALP found itself $50,000 in debt at the end of the 1936 campaign, but substantial contributions from labor groups erased the red ink. The ILGWU itself contributed nearly $142,000 to the 1936 campaign, a relatively huge sum for a third party campaign, given that only $26,000 from all sources had been raised and spent by Norman Thomas' Socialist campaign in the previous presidential election. Party decision-making in the first year was handled by ILGWU executive secretary Fred Umhey, the Amalgamated Clothing Workers Union's Jacob Potofsky, and Alex Rose of the Milliners'.

The success of the ALP in its initial campaign was a beacon for other radical organizations. Although its constitution specifically barred Communists from the organization, there was no enforcement for this provision and large numbers flocked to registration as ALP members from the Communist-led United Electrical Workers, Transport Workers, and State, County, and Municipal Workers.

The chief race in 1937 was that for Mayor of New York, pitting pro-Roosevelt progressive Republican Fiorello LaGuardia against a Democratic state supreme court justice, Jeremiah T. Mahoney. As LaGuardia was on excellent terms with the New York needle trades unions and was a leading spirit in the formation of the ALP, he was a natural choice for the organization's nomination. Democrat Mahoney countered by red-baiting LaGuardia for his ALP connections, calling the new political organization an "active adjunct of the Communist Party." This would come to be a common theme in the political discourse about the new party. Also in the 1937 election the ALP tapped Republican special prosecutor Thomas E. Dewey as its nominee for New York District Attorney. Dewey anticipated a probable loss in his race, owing to a wide advantage for the Democratic Party in voter registrations, a number approaching a ratio of 5-to-1. On election day, however, LaGuardia, Dewey, and the ALP emerged victorious. Of LaGuardia's nearly 1.35 million votes, some 483,000 were registered on the ALP line, while Dewey was elected with nearly 60 percent of the vote.

In 1936, 1940, and 1944, the ALP endorsed Franklin D. Roosevelt for President of the United States. In 1941, American Laborite Joseph V. O'Leary was appointed New York State Comptroller by Governor Herbert H. Lehman both to recognize the ALP's previous and to maintain the party's future support. In 1944 the Congress of Industrial Organization's Greater New York Industrial Union Council, a federation of unions in New York City, formally linked itself to the ALP. The GNYIUC Executive Board "adopted a resolution directing GNYIUC Community Councils, which had been organizing around community issues in neighborhoods throughout the city, to merge into the local ALP clubs," and the "GNYIUC diverted some of its PAC monies directly to the ALP." With this move, the CIO's largest labor federation, consisting of approximately 200 locals and 600,000 members, was formally connected to the ALP. Over the ensuing years, the council would call for local unions to ‘‘Build the American Labor Party, the strongest voice for labor in city and state affairs,’’ and would direct Political Action Stewards in workplaces across the city to ‘‘recruit shop members for active participation in the community activities of the American Labor Party.’’ This support would be instrumental in building the political capacity of the ALP and would ultimately lead to conflicts with the national CIO during the 1948 presidential election.

In 1947, several ALP leaders defected.  On October 9, 1947, Charles Rubinstein, president of the United Civic Associations of the Bronx, member of the ALP's State executive committee, and former ALP candidate for the City Council left the ALP for no other party, due to "misguided Communist sympathizers" within the ALP.  On the same day, George Salvatore, vice chairman of the ALP's Bronx executive committee and former ALP candidate for District Attorney and Supreme Court Justice, left the ALP for the Democratic Party, citing "we are tending to become apologists for Russia's point of view."  The next day, October 10, 1947, Eugene Huber resigned as executive secretary of the ALP's Bayside area to join the Liberal Party of New York State because, Huber said, he had found "affixed a stranglehold by the Communist party upon the ALP which has in consequence become a mere envelope for Communist policies and candidates."

In 1948, rather than support Harry Truman, the ALP backed Progressive Party candidate Henry A. Wallace.  Former Republican Vito Marcantonio won a seat again to the United States House of Representatives, representing East Harlem for the ALP, as he had done in 1938, 1940, 1942, 1944, and 1946 (but lost in 1950).  Marcantonio had been the target of the New York Wilson Pakula Act in 1947 aimed at restricting candidates from one party running in another party's primary election (electoral fusion).  Leo Isacson was elected in early 1948 to fill a vacancy in a Bronx district but lost in the general election in November.  The Communist Party USA openly endorsed the Progressive Party; some ALP candidates that year were known or alleged communists, e.g., Lee Pressman.  Candidates included (winners bolded):
 United States House of Representatives:   Marjorie Viemeister (1st District), Richard T. Mayes (2nd District)  Herbert A. Shingler (3rd District), Thomas J. McCabe (4th District), Morris Pottish (5th District), Irma Lindheim (6th District), Joseph L. Pfeifer (Democrat + ALP) (8th District), Murray Rossof (9th District), Ada B. Jackson (10th District), Frank Serri (11th District), Vincent J. Longhi (12th District), James Griesi (13th District),  Lee Pressman (14th District), Emanuel Celler (Democrat + ALP) (15th District), Frank Cremonesi (16th District), Alvin Udell (17th District), Vito Marcantonio (18th District), Arthur G. Klein  Democrat + ALP) (19th District), Annette T. Rubinstein (20th District),  Paul O'Dwyer (Democrat ALP) (21st District), Adam Clayton Powell Jr. (Democrat + ALP) (22nd District), Leon Straus (23rd District), Leo Isacson (24th District), Albert E. Kahn (25th District), Nicholas Carnes (26th District), Francis X. Nulty (27th District), Pasquale Barile (28th District), Harold M. Chown (29th District), Robert R. Decormier (Democrat + ALP) (30th District), Andrew Peterson (31st District), Margaret L. Wheeler (32nd District), Rockwell Kent (33rd District), Raymond K. Bull (34th District), Max Meyers (35th District), Sidney H. Greenberg (36th District), John Muschock (37th District), Harold Slingerland (39th District), Helen M. Lopez (41st District), Emmanuel Fried (42nd District), George W. Provost (43rd District), Robert Williams (44th District), and Lewis King (45th District).
 New York State Senate:  Francis W. Frazier (1st District), Doris Koppelman (2nd District) John S. Fells (3rd District) Gabriel Kopperl (4th District) Donald H. Smith (5th District) Paul Melone (6th District) John Profeta (7th District) Leroy P. Peterson (8th District) Kenneth Sherbell (10th District) Robert Lund (13th District) Helen I. Phillips (15th District) James Malloy (23rd District) Sol Salz (25th District) Charles Hendley (28th District) S. Fels Hecht (31st District) Sidney H. Greenberg (36th District) Max Meyers (35th District) George La Fortune (36th District) Willard Ryker (42nd District) George W. Provost (43rd District) William Murphy (44th District) and Harry Bailey (51st District).  
 New York State Supreme Court:  Hyman N. Glickstein (1st District), Joseph J. Porte (2nd District),  Paul L. Ross (1st District), Charles Rothenberg (2nd District), Robert V. Santangelo (1st District), Max Torchin (2nd District) and Abraham Wittman (8th District).

Demise 
By the 1950s, the ALP had lost much of its support to the rival Liberal Party of New York, in part because of accusations of communist influence in the ALP.  In 1952, the party endorsed Progressive Party candidate Vincent Hallinan for President, but he attracted little support.  Corliss Lamont made an unsuccessful run under the party's banner for the U.S. Senate, also in 1952. In the 1954 election, the ALP failed to garner 50,000 votes for any of its candidates and it lost its place on the New York ballot. In 1956 the party was terminated by its New York state committee.

Members
 Leo Isacson
 Corliss Lamont
 Vito Marcantonio
 Mary van Kleeck

See also 

 Liberal Party of New York
 Progressive Party (United States, 1948)

References

Further reading

Archives 
 American Labor Party Minutes and Proceedings. Archive #061. The Tamiment Library and Robert F. Wagner Labor Archives at New York University.

Articles 
 Eimer, Stuart, "The CIO and Third Party Politics in New York: The Rise and Fall of the CIO-ALP, " Political Power and Social Theory," Volume 18, (2007) 133-171 online
 Hardman, J.B.S., "The Late-Lamented American Labor Party." Labor and Nation, January–February 1948.
 Waltzer, Kenneth, "The Party and the Polling Place: American Communism and an American Labor Party in the 1930s," Radical History Review, no. 23 (1980).
 Wolfe, Allan, "The Withering Away of the American Labor Party," Rutgers University Library Journal, 31 (1968).

Theses 
 Bakunin, Jack, The Role of the Socialists in the Formation of the American Labor Party. Master's thesis. College of the City of New York, 1965.
 Carter, Robert Frederick, Pressure From the Left: The American Labor Party, 1936–1954. PhD dissertation. Syracuse University, 1965.
 Licht, Walter, An Analysis of a Political Experiment: The American Labor Party (1936–1940), Senior Thesis. Harvard University, 1967.
 Sarasohn, Stephen Beisman, The Struggle for Control of the American Labor Party 1936–1948. Master's thesis. Columbia University, 1948.
 Stern, Sheila Irene, The American Labor Party, 1936–1944. Master's thesis. University of Chicago, 1964.
 Stewart, William James, A Political History of the American Labor Party, 1936–1944. Master's thesis. American University, 1959.
 Waltzer, Kenneth, The American Labor Party: Third Party Politics in New Deal-Cold War New York, 1936–1954. PhD dissertation. Harvard University, 1977.

External links 
Program of the American Labor Party (October 1936)

Political parties established in 1936
Political parties disestablished in 1956
Defunct political parties in the United States
Socialist Party of America
Defunct social democratic parties in the United States
Communist Party USA mass organizations
Left-wing populism in the United States
Regional and state political parties in New York (state)
Labor parties in the United States